This is a list of roads designated A23. Road entries are sorted by alphabetical order of country.

 A23 motorway (Austria), the major city-motorway in Vienna
  A23 road (England), a road connecting London and Brighton, East Sussex
 A23 autoroute, a road connecting Lille and Valenciennes, France
 A 23 motorway (Germany), a road connecting the hinterland of Hamburg
 A23 road (Isle of Man), a road connecting Strang and the Crosby road
 Autostrada A23 (Italy), a road connecting the A4 motorway to the Austrian border
 A23 road (Kenya), a road connecting Voi and Taveta
 A23 road (Northern Ireland), connects the district of Short Strand and the village of Ballygowan
 A23 motorway (Portugal)
 Autovía A-23, a road connecting Huesca and Zaragoza, Spain
 A 23 road (Sri Lanka), a road connecting Wellawaya and Ella-Kumbalwela

See also
 List of highways numbered 23